Danial Ibrahim (born 9 August 2004) is an English cricketer.

Early life
Ibrahim's parents are from Pakistan, where his father played some first-class cricket.

He was educated at Bede's School, and played club cricket for Preston Nomads.

Domestic career
He made his first-class debut on 3 June 2021, for Sussex in the 2021 County Championship. At the age of 16 years and 299 days, Ibrahim became the youngest cricketer to score a half-century in the history of the County Championship. He made his List A debut on 23 July 2021, for Sussex in the 2021 Royal London One-Day Cup.

References

External links
 

2004 births
Living people
English cricketers
Sussex cricketers
Cricketers from Burnley
British sportspeople of Pakistani descent